Jamal Osman is a Somali-born British journalist, filmmaker and broadcast reporter. He has produced and reported for Channel 4, The Guardian and Al-Jazeera English, and specializes on stories pertaining to Africa.

Awards

RTS Independent Award 2012
One World Media Award 2012, Journalist of the Year
Amnesty International Media Awards 2010, Gaby Rado Memorial Award
Foreign Press Association Awards 2009, News Story of the Year
Kingston University News Reporter of the Year 2009
Royal Television Society Award 2010, RTS Independent Award
Amnesty International Media Awards 2009, shortlisted
Rory Peck Impact Award 2009

References

External links
Official website
Channel 4
ALJAZEERA
The Guardian
BBC
 

Living people
Somalian journalists
British reporters and correspondents
People from Kismayo
Year of birth missing (living people)